Gillian Akiko Thomson  (born October 8, 1974) is a Filipina television host, journalist and retired swimmer. She is the most accomplished Filipina swimmer in the Southeast Asian Games having won eight gold medals in the biennial multi-sport meet between 1987 and 1993. She is the youngest of three children born to a Japanese mother from Hiroshima, Hiroko Nakamura and American father, James Marsh Thomson. Her older siblings are Julia and Joshua. When she was young, she and her family moved to Manila where her father, who had previous experience with the United States Office of Naval Intelligence, became the Executive Director of the American Chamber of Commerce of the Philippines in the latter years of the Marcos dictatorship.

Thomson began swimming at the age of six. She started to represent the Philippines in several swimming competitions locally and abroad after becoming a naturalized Filipino citizen through an Act of Congress by the age of 12. Among the tournaments she competed in are the 1987, 1989, 1991  and 1993 South East Asian Games, where she won eight gold medals  and also in three editions of the Summer Olympic Games in 1988, 1992 and 1996 .

Thomson graduated with a degree in Anthropology at the University of California, Berkeley and then took her masters in Business Administration at the Ateneo de Manila University. After her retirement from competitive swimming, she became a television host and journalist with Probe Productions at ABS-CBN. She is married to Chips Guevara and had a baby in 2011.

At present, Thomson is the current president of Philippine Olympians Association, replacing former president Art Macapagal.

Filmography

Television
Game Plan
Cheche Lazaro Presents
Probe

Commercials
Tender Care
Milo
Rejoice

References

1974 births
Living people
ABS-CBN News and Current Affairs people
American people of Japanese descent
American emigrants to the Philippines
Ateneo de Manila University alumni
Filipino people of American descent
Filipino people of Japanese descent
Filipino female swimmers
Naturalized citizens of the Philippines
Olympic swimmers of the Philippines
People from Manila
People from Washington, D.C.
Swimmers at the 1988 Summer Olympics
Swimmers at the 1992 Summer Olympics
Swimmers at the 1996 Summer Olympics
University of California, Berkeley alumni
Southeast Asian Games medalists in swimming
Southeast Asian Games gold medalists for the Philippines
Southeast Asian Games silver medalists for the Philippines
Swimmers at the 1994 Asian Games
Competitors at the 1987 Southeast Asian Games
Competitors at the 1991 Southeast Asian Games
Asian Games competitors for the Philippines